The Men's normal hill individual ski jumping competition for the 2006 Winter Olympics was held in Pragelato, Italy. It began on 11 February, and concluded on 12 February.

Lars Bystøl of Norway won his country's first gold and his second international victory of the season, beating Matti Hautamäki to the title by only one point.

Dmitry Vassiliev could have won Russia's second ski jumping gold medal ever because he had the best jump in the first round. But as the last starter in the second round, he failed and finished tenth

This was the last highly ranked official event participated by Masahiko Harada - who won 2 Olympic medals in Nagano and 1 in Lillehammer - and it was after a break of over 3 years from participating in Ski jumping World Cup. Unfortunately for him, he was disqualified in the qualifying and did not compete in the final. Later he started only in FIS Cup event in Sapporo.

Results

Qualifying

Fifteen skiers were pre-qualified, on the basis of their World Cup performance, meaning that they directly advanced to the final round. These skiers still jumped in the qualifying round, but they were not included with non-pre-qualified skiers in the standings. The fifty-four skiers who were not pre-qualified competed for thirty-five spots in the final round.

Final
The final consisted of two jumps, with the top thirty after the first jump qualifying for the second jump. The combined total of the two jumps was used to determine the final ranking.

References

Ski jumping at the 2006 Winter Olympics